Six ships of the Royal Navy have borne the name HMS Rifleman:

  was a 12-gun gun-brig purchased in 1804 and sold in 1809.
  was an 18-gun  launched in 1809 and sold in 1836. She then became a whaler, making three whaling voyages between 1837 and 1856.
  was a  wooden screw gunvessel launched in 1846 and sold in Hong Kong in 1869.
  was a  composite screw gunvessel launched in 1872 and sold in 1890.
  was an  completed in 1910 and sold for breaking in 1921. 
  was an  completed in 1944. She was used as an accommodation ship in Barrow in 1970 and sold for breaking in 1972.
 A  named HMS Rifle was laid down in 1944, but cancelled in 1945.

Royal Navy ship names